Wendy Palmer (born August 12, 1974) is a former professional basketball player in the  WNBA, and former head coach of the UNCG women's basketball team. Her primary position was forward.

High school
Born in Timberlake, North Carolina, Palmer attended Person Senior High School in Roxboro, North Carolina, where she was named a High School All-American by the WBCA. She participated in the inaugural WBCA  High School All-America Game in 1992, scoring eleven points.

College
Palmer graduated from the University of Virginia in 1996, and is a member of the Zeta Phi Beta sorority.

USA Basketball
Palmer was named to the team representing the US at the  1994 William Jones Cup competition in Taipei, Taiwan. The USA team won all eight games, winning the gold medal, but not without close calls. In three games the teams had to come from behind to win. One preliminary game ended up as a single-point victory, and the gold medal game went to overtime before the USA team beat South Korea by a single point, 90–89. Palmer was the leading scorer for the team, averaging 18.9 points per game. She also led the team in rebounding with 9.3 per game.

WNBA career
Palmer was originally drafted by the Utah Starzz 9th overall in the 2nd round of the 1997 Elite draft.  She played for the Starzz until 1999, when she became a member of the Detroit Shock.

In 2002, she played for the Orlando Miracle, which later became the Connecticut Sun. In 2004, while as a member of the Sun, she received the WNBA Most Improved Player Award.

In 2005, she played for the San Antonio Silver Stars.  After the season ended, she was hired as an assistant coach to the women's basketball team at Virginia Commonwealth University.

In 2006, she signed a free agent contract with the Storm, but played only five games with the team before suffering a partially torn Achilles tendon in her left foot.

Coaching career
Palmer took her first coaching position at Virginia Commonwealth University while playing in the WNBA. In 2007, she joined the staff at the University of Kentucky under Coach Matthew Mitchell. She remained there until 2009.

In 2009, Palmer became an assistant coach at the University of Virginia under legendary Coach Debbie Ryan.

In 2011, Palmer became the women's head coach at the University of North Carolina at Greensboro.

Notes

External links
WNBA Player Profile
June 2006 Seattle Storm article on her injury
July 2005 press release on joining the Virginia Commonwealth University coaching staff

1974 births
Living people
All-American college women's basketball players
American expatriate basketball people in Hungary
American expatriate basketball people in Spain
American expatriate basketball people in Turkey
American women's basketball coaches
American women's basketball players
Basketball players from North Carolina
Connecticut Sun players
Detroit Shock players
Galatasaray S.K. (women's basketball) players
Kentucky Wildcats women's basketball coaches
Orlando Miracle players
Parade High School All-Americans (girls' basketball)
People from Person County, North Carolina
Power forwards (basketball)
San Antonio Stars players
Seattle Storm players
UNC Greensboro Spartans women's basketball coaches
Utah Starzz draft picks
Utah Starzz players
VCU Rams women's basketball coaches
Virginia Cavaliers women's basketball coaches
Virginia Cavaliers women's basketball players
Women's National Basketball Association All-Stars